The Pacific Amphitheatre is an amphitheatre in Costa Mesa, Orange County, California. The amphitheatre is located on the grounds of the OC Fair & Event Center. It opened in July 1983 on the site of the model railroad building of the fairgrounds, with Barry Manilow as the first performer.

On June 30, 1984, a performance at the venue by Jefferson Starship was broadcast live nationwide by the ABC Rock Radio Network. 

Whitney Houston performed at the venue on May 17, 1991, during her I'm Your Baby Tonight World Tour.
 
The fairgrounds are surrounded by dense residential developments, and the amphitheatre was the focus of numerous noise complaints from local residents, prior to being closed in the early 1990s.
 
After almost a decade, it was reopened in 2003, in conjunction with the annual Orange County Fair. As part of an agreement with local residents, concerts are only held concurrently with the fair.
 
Since its reopening, the venue rarely uses the "lawn" area, effectively reducing seating capacity from approximately 18,765 to 8,500. After further construction and improvements in 2015, the seating was reduced to 8,000.

In addition to concerts, the location is the site of commencement for nearby Orange Coast College.

The venue hosted the final concert of Marvin Gaye before his death.

Bob Dylan performed at Pacific Amphitheater on 28 July, 2003.

Jethro Tull performed at Pacific Amphitheater on 1 August, 2003.

See also
List of contemporary amphitheatres

References

External links
OC Fair & Event Center website

Buildings and structures completed in 1983
Amphitheaters in California
Music venues in California
Buildings and structures in Costa Mesa, California
Tourist attractions in Costa Mesa, California